Rafael Abad Anselmo (born in Seville, Spain on December 23, 1981) better known by his stage name Rasel, is a Spanish singer, with various influences including rap, reggae, R&B and dance music. His debut was with "Publicidad engañosa" in 2007. His biggest commercial success is the 2012 hit "Me pones tierno" featuring Carlos Baute reaching #6 on the Spanish Singles Chart. He is signed to Warner Music..

Discography

Studios albums

Singles

Featured in

References

External links
YouTube
Last.fm

Spanish male singers
Spanish male rappers
1981 births
Living people
People from Seville